Fakhr al-Din Muhammad ibn Mansur Mubarak Shah al-Qurayshi, commonly known by his pen-name Fakhr-i Mudabbir (1157–1236) was a Persian author who was active at the court of the Ghaznavids, Ghurids, and Delhi Sultanate. He is notable for his prominent literary works in Persian, the Shajara-yi ansab ("The tree of genealogies") and the Adab al-harb wa-l-shaja'a ("The etiquette of war and valour").

References

Sources

Further work 
 
 
 

12th-century Persian-language writers
13th-century Persian-language writers
1236 deaths
1157 births
Ghaznavid scholars
People of the Ghurid Empire
12th-century Iranian historians
13th-century Iranian historians